Crambus angulatus is a moth of the family Crambidae first described by William Barnes and James Halliday McDunnough in 1918. It is found in North America, including California.

References

Crambini
Moths described in 1918
Moths of North America